Zastava 1300 may refer to one of two automobiles:

 A version of the Fiat 1300 and 1500

 A version of the Zastava Skala

1300